Lisa (Marie) Bellear (2 May 1961 in Melbourne, Victoria – 5 July 2006 in Melbourne) was an Indigenous Australian poet, photographer, activist, spokeswoman, dramatist, comedian and broadcaster. She was a Goenpul woman of the Noonuccal people of Minjerribah (Stradbroke Island), Queensland. Her uncles were Bob Bellear, Australia's first Indigenous judge, and Sol Bellear who helped to found the Aboriginal Housing Corporation in Redfern in 1972.

Bellear was adopted into a white family as a baby and was told she had Polynesian heritage. As an adult she explored her Aboriginal roots.

Bellear died unexpectedly at her home in Melbourne. She was 45 years old. She was buried at Mullumbimby cemetery.

Published works and photography
Bellear wrote Dreaming in Urban Areas (UQP, 1996), a book of poetry which explores the experience of Aboriginal people in contemporary society. She said in an interview with Roberta Sykes that her "poetry was not about putting down white society. It's about self-discovery."

Other poetry was published in journals and newspapers. She was awarded the Deadly Awards prize in 2006 for making an outstanding contribution to literature with her play The Dirty Mile: A History of Indigenous Fitzroy, a suburb of Melbourne.

Bellear was a prolific photographer. Her work was exhibited at the 2004 Athens Olympic Games and at the Melbourne Museum as part of their millennium celebrations.

Community activities
Bellear was a broadcaster at the community radio station 3CR in Melbourne where she presented the show 'Not Another Koori Show' for over 20 years. She was a member of the 2003 Victorian Stolen Generations Taskforce, having herself been removed from her parents under this policy.

She was also a founding member of the Ilbijerri Aboriginal & Torres Strait Islander Theatre Co-op, the longest-running Aboriginal theatre troupe in Australia. Ilbijerri produced The Dirty Mile in March 2006 as a dramatised walking trail through the streets of Fitzroy, Melbourne.

Recognition
In 2008 Bellear was inducted posthumously to the Victorian Honour Roll of Women. The City of Melbourne in partnership with the Victorian Women's Trust recognised Bellear's life and work in 2018 in naming a laneway in Carlton, Warrior Woman Lane, after her. The University of Melbourne named student accommodation at 303 Royal Parade, Parkville, Melbourne as Lisa Bellear House.

References 

1961 births
2006 deaths
Australian indigenous rights activists
Women human rights activists
Australian photographers
Australian women writers
Indigenous Australian writers
Australian Aboriginal artists
Australian women artists
Australian feminist writers
Indigenous Australian feminists
Members of the Stolen Generations